St. Joseph Minor Seminary (Sint-Jozef Klein Seminarie or SJKS) is a Catholic secondary school in Sint-Niklaas, Diocese of Ghent, Belgium. There were previously a Recollect monastery and a seminary on the site.

History 
The first buildings were built starting April 1689, the friars were authorised to found the second monastery in the city. 
The Chapel of Saint Anthony was completed in 1692 and in 1696 Mgr vander Noot, bishop of Ghent consecrated the church, in baroque style and famous for the major carvings of Jan Boeksent. The friars lived there until the French Revolution in the conventual buildings. After they were chased out they never returned. It was later sold to Maurice-Jean de Broglie who converted the old monastery into a Minor seminary dedicated to Saint Joseph. Many important priests were educated here. For the centenary of the school, Pope Pius X sent his personal pontifical blessing in 1908.

Today the seminary has gone, and the building is now part of the Catholic secondary school property of the diocese. At the end of the last century the old main staircase went up in flames. The church was saved from the fire.

Notable teachers and students

Bishops 
 Honoré Jozef Coppieters, bishop of Ghent.
 Henri-Charles Lambrecht, bishop of Ghent.
 Oscar Joliet, bishop of Ghent.
 Antoon Stillemans, bishop of Ghent.
 Gustaaf Joos, Cardinal and bishop of Ypres.
 Henry Gabriels, bishop of Ogdensburg.
 Augustine Van de Vyver, bishop of Richmond.

Others 
 Amaat Joos
 Camil Van Hulse
 Blessed Edward Poppe 
 Anton van Wilderode

References

External links 
 http://basis.sjks.eu/welkom/
 http://www.sjks.be/

Sint-Niklaas
Catholic seminaries in Belgium
Churches in East Flanders
Franciscan monasteries in Belgium
Baroque architecture in Belgium
Neoclassical architecture in Belgium
Educational institutions established in 1808